Uchimura may refer to
Uchimura (surname)
Uchimura Dam in the Nagano Prefecture, Japan
Uchimura Produce, a Japanese TV comedy program